Hwair (also ,) is the name of , the Gothic letter expressing the  or  sound (reflected in English by the inverted wh-spelling for ). Hwair is also the name of the Latin ligature  (capital ) used to transcribe Gothic.

Name
The name of the Gothic letter is recorded by Alcuin in Codex Vindobonensis 795 as uuaer. The meaning of the name  was probably "cauldron, pot"
(cf.  "skull"); comparative reconstruction shows *kʷer- (“a kind of dish or pot”) in Proto-Indo-European.

There was no Elder Futhark rune for the phoneme, so that unlike those of most Gothic letters, the name does not continue the name of a rune (but see qairþra).

Sound
Gothic  is the reflex of Common Germanic , which in turn continues the  Indo-European labiovelar * after it underwent Grimm's law. The same phoneme in Old English and Old High German is spelled hw.

Transliteration
The Gothic letter is transliterated with the Latin ligature of the same name, which was introduced by philologists around 1900 to replace the digraph hv, which was formerly used to express the phoneme, e.g. by Migne (vol. 18) in the 1860s. It is used, for example, in Dania transcription.

Related letters and other similar characters
 : IPA letter Bilabial click
Ԋ ԋ : Komi Nje, a letter in the Molodtsov alphabet
Ꙩ ꙩ : Cyrillic letter Monocular O
ん : N (kana)
Խ խ : Armenian Khe

Computing codes

Note that the Unicode names of the Latin letters are different: "Hwair" and "Hv".

See also
 Phonological history of wh
 Wh (digraph)

References

Latin-script letters
Palaeography
Gothic writing